Meredith McGrath and Matt Lucena were the defending champions but only Lucena competed that year with Kimberly Po.

Po and Lucena lost in the first round to Els Callens and Tom Kempers.

Lisa Raymond and Patrick Galbraith won in the final 7–6(8–6), 7–6(7–4) against Manon Bollegraf and Rick Leach.

Seeds
Champion seeds are indicated in bold text while text in italics indicates the round in which those seeds were eliminated.

Draw

Final

Top half

Bottom half

References
1996 US Open – Doubles draws and results at the International Tennis Federation

Mixed Doubles
US Open (tennis) by year – Mixed doubles